Souljah Fyah is a reggae band based in Canada. The band was founded in 2002 by vocalist–bassist Waymatea (Janaya) "Sista J" Ellis (Love Empire Enterprises) and stylistically straddles Roots Reggae and Dancehall.

Their second full-length album, Truth Will Reveal, released in 2008, was nominated for a Juno Award for "Reggae Album of the Year", and won both "Outstanding Urban Recording" at the Western Canadian Music Awards and "Best Reggae Album" at the 2009 Reggae Music Achievement Awards. The album's producer, IBO, was nominated for a Reggae Music Achievement Award for his work on the recording.

Souljah Fyah was named "Top Reggae Band" at the 2009 Canadian Reggae Music Awards. That year, Souljah Fyah released an EP of songs produced by Stew Kirkwood called Tears of a Fool. A third full-length album, I Wish, was released at the end of 2010. The band also released a self-titled album in 2004.

Discography
Souljah Fyah (2004)
Truth Will Reveal (2008)
Tears of a Fool EP (2009)
I Wish (2010)
The Long Walk (2016)

References

External links
 Official Website
 SonicBids page
 Souljah Fyah's Myspace

Canadian reggae musical groups
2001 establishments in Alberta
Musical groups established in 2001